Sneha is a popular Hindu Indian feminine given name, which means "Affection".

Notable people named Sneha 
Sneha (actress) (born 1981), Indian actress in South Indian films - Tamil, Telugu, Malayalam and Kannada languages
Sneha Khanwalkar (born 1983), Indian music director
Sneha Anne Philip (1969–2001), Indian-American physician
Sneha Kishore (born 1993), Indian cricketer
Sneha Sharma (born 1990), Indian racing driver and pilot
Sneha Solanki (born 1973), British artist and educator
Sneha Ullal (born 1987), Indian actress in Hindi and Telugu films
Sneha Wagh (born 1987), Indian actress in Hindi and Marathi TV series

Indian feminine given names